J. Leslie Sensenbrenner House is a 19th and 20th Century Revival home in Neenah, Wisconsin. It was designed by Thomas Van Alyea and it was added to the National Register of Historic Places listings in Wisconsin on September 2, 2003.

History
The home was completed in 1935 and is located in Neenah, Wisconsin. It was built by the son of Kimberly-Clark president, J. Leslie Sensenbrenner. It is a waterfront property with the Fox River to the west and Lake Winnebago to the East.

The home was added to the National Register of Historic Places listings in Wisconsin (03000897) on September 2, 2003.

Design

References

Houses in Wisconsin
National Register of Historic Places in Wisconsin